Charlie Parsons is a TV producer.

Charlie Parsons may also refer to:

Charlie Parsons (baseball)
Charlie Parsons (footballer)

See also
Charles Parsons (disambiguation)